Sibley may refer to:

 Sibley (surname)
 Sibley (automobile)

Places and landmarks 
In Canada:
 Sibley Peninsula, Ontario (on Lake Superior)

In the United States:
 Sibley, Illinois
 Sibley, Iowa
 Sibley, Kansas
 Sibley, Louisiana
 Sibley, Mississippi
 Sibley, Missouri
 Sibley, North Dakota
 Sibley County, Minnesota
 Sibley Memorial Hospital, in Washington, D.C.
 Robert Sibley Volcanic Regional Preserve, in California
 Sibley Park

Other 
 Sibley–Ahlquist taxonomy of birds, a phenetic DNA-based taxonomy of birds
 Sibley's, a former New York state department store chain
 Sibley's Shoes, a former Michigan retail footwear chain
 Sibley fire, a 1904 New York disaster